This is a list of recipients of medals awarded by the Royal Aeronautical Society.

Individual medal recipients

Gold Medal recipients
 1909 - Wilbur and Orville Wright
 1910 - Octave Chanute
 1945 - Air Cdre Frank Whittle
 1949 - Sydney Camm
 1950 - Sir Geoffrey de Havilland
 1952 - Theodore von Kármán
 1955 - Ernest Hives, 1st Baron Hives - "for his outstanding work in the field of aircraft propulsion.".
 1957 - Robert Lickley
 1958 - Stuart Davies
 1959 - Marcel Dassault
 1960 - Sir Frederick Handley Page
 1964 - Ronald Eric Bishop
 1967 - Stanley Hooker
 1977 - Sir Frederick Page
 1977 - George Lee
 1983 - Geoffrey Lilley
 1986 - Ralph Hooper
 2009 - Henry McDonald
 2012 - Elon Musk
 2014 - Dr Gordon McConnell
 2015 - Professor Richard J Parker

Silver Medal recipients
Winners of the annual Silver Medal of the Royal Aeronautical Society
 1962 - Dietrich Küchemann
 1967 - Charles Joy
 1971 - John Argyris
 1991 - Roy Dommett
 2005 - Professor David Southwood
 2010 - Frank De Winne
 2011 - Professor Terence Jones
 2012 - Robert Smith 
 2013 - Professor John Denton
 2014 - Mr Frank Ogilvie
 2014 - Mr Robert Saia
 2015 - G. Satheesh Reddy

Team medal recipients

Team Gold Medalists

 2004 - SpaceShipOne
 2005 - Airbus A380 Wing Design Team
 2007 - BERP rotor development team
 2008 - Trent 900 Engineering Team
 2009 - Vectored-thrust Aircraft Advanced Control (VAAC) Team
 2009 - Jules Verne ATV Operations Team
 2014 - Project Zero Team 
 2015 - Rosetta Mission Team 
 2019 - Chang'e 4 Lunar Landing Mission Team

Team Silver Medalists

 2005 - Huygens project team
 2008 - Cranfield Aerospace X-48B UAV
 2010 - Mantis UAV project team
 2011 - HYLAS-1 team
 2012 - CAMPS development team
 2013 - ASTRAEA Team
 2014 - Team Taranis
 2015 - The Beagle 2 Mars Mission Engineering Team

References

medal recipients
Royal Aeronautical Society